The 2021–22 LEN Euro League Women is the 34th edition of the major competition for European women's water polo clubs. It started on 18 November 2021.

Qualification round

Group A 

  Dynamo Uralochka 15–11 ANO Glyfada 
  CSS Verona 26–10 ASA Tel Aviv 
  CN Terrassa 10–8 CSS Verona 
  ANO Glyfada 18–2 ASA Tel Aviv 
  CN Terrassa 27–5 ASA Tel Aviv 
  Dynamo Uralochka 12–9 CN Terrassa 
  Dynamo Uralochka 12–9 CSS Verona 
  ANO Glyfada 12–11 CSS Verona 
  Dynamo Uralochka 29–8 ASA Tel Aviv 
  CN Terrassa 9–5 ANO Glyfada

Group B 

  Lille 27–3 Sirens 
  SIS Roma 20–7 ZVL–Tetteroo 
  Mediterrrani 10–8 Ferencvarosi 
  SIS Roma 15–10 Mediterrrani 
  Ferencvarosi 11–8 Lille  
  ZVL–Tetteroo 25–2 Sirens 
  Ferencvarosi 13–7 ZVL–Tetteroo 
  SIS Roma 31–4 Sirens 
  Mediterrrani 12–9 Lille 
  SIS Roma 8–4 Ferencvarosi 
  Mediterrrani 28–5 Sirens 
  Lille 13–9 ZVL–Tetteroo 
  Ferencvarosi 28–2 Sirens 
  SIS Roma 16–12 Lille  
  Mediterrrani 11–10 ZVL–Tetteroo

Group C 

  Plebiscito Padova 9–8 CN Mataró 
  NC Vouliagmeni 13–5 BVSC-Zuglo 
  Spandau 13–13 Nice 
  CN Mataró 20–6 Spandau 
  BVSC-Zuglo 12–6 Nice 
  Plebiscito Padova 7–7 NC Vouliagmeni 
  Plebiscito Padova 11–6 BVSC-Zuglo 
  CN Mataró 19–7 Nice 
  NC Vouliagmeni 15–13 Spandau 
  Plebiscito Padova 16–4 Spandau 
  CN Mataró 15–8 BVSC-Zuglo 
  NC Vouliagmeni 15–6 Nice 
  CN Mataró 8–6 NC Vouliagmeni 
  Plebiscito Padova 15–8 Nice 
  BVSC-Zuglo 12–11 Spandau

Group D 

  CN Sabadell 34–3 Pacense 
  Ekipe Orizzonte 15–14 Ethnikos Piraeus 
  Ethnikos Piraeus 25–4 Pacense 
  CN Sabadell 15–8 Ethnikos Piraeus 
  Ekipe Orizzonte 21–6 Ol. Kosice 
  Ol. Kosice 16–9 Pacense 
  Ekipe Orizzonte 25–2 Pacense 
  CN Sabadell 31–5 Ol. Kosice 
  CN Sabadell 11–7 Ekipe Orizzonte 
  Ethnikos Piraeus 23–4 Ol. Kosice

Preliminary round 
Source:

Group E 

  CN Sabadell 11–6 Ferencvarosi 
  Dunaujvaros 12–8 CN Mataró 
  CN Mataró 14–5 Ferencvarosi 
  CN Sabadell 10–7 Dunaujvaros 
  Dunaujvaros 13–10 Ferencvarosi 
  CN Mataró 10–9 CN Sabadell

Group F 

  Olympiacos Piraeus 11–5 CN Terrassa 
  Ethnikos Piraeus 14–5 SIS Roma 
  Olympiacos Piraeus 15–8 SIS Roma 
  Ethnikos Piraeus 8–7 CN Terrassa 
  CN Terrassa 12–7 SIS Roma 
  Olympiacos Piraeus 9–5 Ethnikos Piraeus

Group G 

  UVSE 11–5 NC Vouliagmeni 
  Dynamo Uralochka 15–8 Ekipe Orizzonte 
  NC Vouliagmeni 9–7 Ekipe Orizzonte 
  UVSE 13–12 Dynamo Uralochka 
  Dynamo Uralochka 12–11 NC Vouliagmeni 
  UVSE 9–9 Ekipe Orizzonte

Group H 

  Plebiscito Padova 10–8 Mediterrrani 
  Kinef Kirishi 16–12 ANO Glyfada 
  Plebiscito Padova 14–10 ANO Glyfada 
  Kinef Kirishi 9–9 Mediterrrani 
  Mediterrrani 17–12 ANO Glyfada 
  Plebiscito Padova 7–7 Kinef Kirishi

Quarterfinals 
Sources:

|}
05/02/2022  Olympiacos Piraeus 14–9 Dunaujvaros 

26/02/2022  Dunaujvaros 7–10 Olympiacos Piraeus 

20/02/2022  Plebiscito Padova 8–11 Dynamo Uralochka 

03/03/2022  Dynamo Uralochka W.O. Plebiscito Padova 

05/02/2022  Kinef Kirishi 8–7 UVSE 

26/02/2022  UVSE7–11 Kinef Kirishi 

05/02/2022  Ethnikos Piraeus 8–13 CN Sabadell 

26/02/2022  CN Sabadell 8–6 Ethnikos Piraeus 

 Kinef Kirishi and Dynamo Uralochka were disqualified. Padova and UVSE replaced them in the F4.

Final Four

References 

LEN Euro League Women seasons
2022 in water polo
2021–22 in LEN water polo